Male is a Madang language spoken in Madang Province, Papua New Guinea.

References

Mindjim languages
Languages of Madang Province